One bill may refer to:
 Convergent charging, where a single bill is used for multiple telecommunications services from a single company, as is frequently done with triple play or quadruple play bundles
 United States one-dollar bill